Egzon Kryeziu (born 25 April 2000) is a Slovenian professional footballer who plays as a midfielder for Górnik Łęczna.

Personal life
Kryeziu is the brother of Mentor Kryeziu and Edison Kryeziu.

Honours 
Triglav Kranj
Slovenian Second League: 2016–17

References

External links 
 Egzon Kryeziu at NK Triglav 
 Egzon Kryeziu at NZS 

2000 births
Living people
Sportspeople from Kranj
Slovenian footballers
Slovenia under-21 international footballers
Slovenian people of Kosovan descent
Slovenian people of Albanian descent
Association football midfielders
NK Triglav Kranj players
Lechia Gdańsk players
Lechia Gdańsk II players
Górnik Łęczna players
Slovenian Second League players
Slovenian PrvaLiga players
Ekstraklasa players
IV liga players
Slovenian expatriate footballers
Slovenian expatriate sportspeople in Poland
Expatriate footballers in Poland
Slovenia youth international footballers